The 2014–15 season was St Johnstone's sixth-consecutive season in the top flight of Scottish football and their second in the newly established Scottish Premiership. St Johnstone also competed in the League Cup, the Scottish Cup and the Europa League. They also went into the season the holders of the Scottish Cup, having won it for the first time in their history the previous year.

Summary
St Johnstone kept manager Tommy Wright for the season with Callum Davidson assistant. They went into the 2014–15 Season as Scottish Cup holders after winning it for the first time in their history the previous year. However, they were unable to retain the trophy after losing to Queen of the South in the Fifth Round.

Results and fixtures

Pre-season/friendlies

Scottish Premiership

UEFA Europa League

Qualifying phase

Scottish League Cup

Scottish Cup

Squad statistics
During the 2014–15 season, St Johnstone have used twenty three different players in competitive games. The table below shows the number of appearances and goals scored by each player.

Appearances
Includes all competitive matches. Alan Mannus is the only player to have played every minute of every game in this season

|-
|colspan="14"|Players who left the club during the 2014–15 season
|-

|}

Goal scorers

Disciplinary record
Includes all competitive matches. 

Last updated 24 May 2015

Team statistics

League table

Results by opponent
St Johnstone score first

Source: 2014–15 Scottish Premier League Results Table

Transfers

Players in

Players out

Notes and references 

St Johnstone F.C. seasons
St Johnstone